Luis Riba Farrés (born November 11, 1967) is a former Spanish tennis player who won a bronze medal at the 1987 Mediterranean Games and reached as high as the 23rd position in the Spanish national ranking.

A former coach of Olympic champion Nicolás Massú, he is not related to fellow countryman Pere Riba.

References

External links

Spanish male tennis players
Living people
1967 births

Mediterranean Games bronze medalists for Spain
Competitors at the 1987 Mediterranean Games
Mediterranean Games medalists in tennis
Tennis players from Barcelona